The Ghost  is a 2007 political thriller by the best-selling English novelist and journalist Robert Harris. In 2010, the novel was adapted into a film, The Ghost Writer, directed by Roman Polanski and starring Pierce Brosnan, for which Polanski and Harris co-wrote the screenplay.

Plot summary
Most of the action takes place on Martha's Vineyard, Massachusetts, where former British Prime Minister Adam Lang has been holed up in the holiday home of his billionaire American publisher to turn out his memoirs on a deadline. Lang's former aide, Mike McAra, was struggling to ghost-write Lang's memoirs. However, McAra drowned when he apparently fell off the Woods Hole ferry. The fictional narrator of The Ghost, whose name is never given, is hired to replace him. His girlfriend walks out on him over his willingness to take the job: "She felt personally betrayed by him; she used to be a party member". The narrator begins to suspect foul play over McAra's death.

Meanwhile, Lang is accused by his enemies of war crimes. A leaked memorandum has revealed that he secretly approved the capture and the extraordinary rendition of British citizens to Guantanamo Bay to face interrogation and torture. Richard Rycart, Lang's disillusioned and renegade former foreign secretary (loosely based on Robin Cook), who before and during his early days in office made much of his wish to adopt an "ethical" foreign policy, is now at the United Nations in a position to do his former boss serious damage. Lang thus appears in imminent threat of indictment at the International Criminal Court.

The narrator borrows a car, which was previously used by McAra. McAra's last journey is still programmed into the satnav, and the narrator follows the route to the home of Professor Paul Emmett, who attended Cambridge with Lang, but Emmett is evasive about his connection to Lang. The narrator investigates Emmett and discovers an accusation that he is a CIA agent. The narrator discovers Rycart's phone number amongst McAra's things, and arranges to meet him in New York. Rycart says that he and McAra had concluded Lang was recruited by Emmett into the CIA.

Lang is blown up by a British suicide bomber. The narrator finishes writing the book. At its launch party, he sees that Lang's wife Ruth knows Professor Emmett. The narrator recalls a remark Lang had made, and realises the first word of each chapter of the manuscript encode a hidden message: "Langs wife Ruth studying in 76 was recruited as a CIA agent in America by Professor Paul Emmett of Harvard University".

Reception

The character Adam Lang is a thinly-disguised version of Tony Blair. The fictional counterpart of Cherie Blair is depicted as a sinister manipulator of her husband. Harris told The Guardian before publication: "The day this appears a writ might come through the door. But I would doubt it, knowing him".

The New York Observer commented that the book's "shock-horror revelation" is "so shocking it simply can't be true, though if it were it would certainly explain pretty much everything about the recent history of Great Britain".

Harris said in a National Public Radio interview that politicians like Lang and Blair, particularly when they have been in office a long time, become divorced from everyday reality, read little and end up with a limited outlook. When it comes to writing their memoirs, that tends to make them need a ghostwriter.

Film adaptation

In November 2007 it was announced that Roman Polanski was to direct the film version of the novel. He and Harris would be writing the script. The cast was at first to consist of Nicolas Cage as the ghost, Pierce Brosnan as Adam Lang, with Tilda Swinton as Ruth Lang and Kim Cattrall as Lang's assistant Amelia Bly. Filming was delayed and a year later it was announced that Ewan McGregor would play the ghost instead of Cage and Olivia Williams would take over the role of Ruth Lang. The film was a French-German-British joint production, with Babelsberg Studios near Berlin having a central role and most scenes, especially those from Martha's Vineyard, were shot in Germany. Harris was quoted as saying: "I want to be sure it's out before Tony Blair's own memoirs are published."

Polanski was arrested by Swiss police in September 2009 on his way to the Zurich Film Festival. Babelsberg Studios initially announced that production was put on hold. However, Polanski continued working on post-production from his house arrest in Switzerland. The film, retitled The Ghost Writer, premiered at the 60th Berlin International Film Festival on 12 February 2010. It won multiple awards.

References

External links
 Daily Telegraph review
 
 Arcadia Institution Website (fictional)
 

2007 British novels
British thriller novels
Novels by Robert Harris
British novels adapted into films
Cultural depictions of Tony Blair
Novels set on Cape Cod and the Islands
Martha's Vineyard in fiction
Hutchinson (publisher) books
Ghostwriting in fiction

fi:Aave